Sargus maculatus is a European species of soldier fly.

References

Stratiomyidae
Diptera of Europe
Insects described in 1936
Taxa named by Erwin Lindner